The 2021–22 Vermont Catamounts men's ice hockey season was the 59th season of play for the program, the 49th at the Division I level, and the 38th season in the Hockey East conference. The Catamounts represented the University of Vermont and were coached by Todd Woodcroft, in his 2nd season.

Season
After a mercifully abbreviated season the year before, Vermont's rebuild under Woodcroft continued with a slow start. The Catamounts' offense was woefully inadequate for most of the season with the team able to score more than 3 goals on only three occasions. Surprisingly, the first of those happened against #9 Boston College. While time would later diminish that achievement due to a poor season from the Eagles, it was still Vermont's first victory over their conference rivals in six years. Unfortunately, the Catamounts had to wait almost a month for their second win. It was only a winning weekend against Maine that kept Vermont out of the conference cellar, though only by a hair's breadth.

During the winter break, Dovar Tinling left the team and signed with the Des Moines Buccaneers. Because it was a junior club, Tinling remained eligible for Division I college hockey.

The Catamounts did only marginally better in the second half of the season, recording five more wins to bring their season's total up to eight. The defense played admirably in front of both Gabe Carriere and Tyler Harmon, limiting the opposition to less than 30 shots per game. The offense, however, didn't improve and neither goaltender received much help in that respect.

When Vermont entered the postseason, they were a severe underdog against Providence. Though they did well to keep the score close against the Friars, the Catamounts were more than doubled in shots and scored their only marker of the game on the power play after Carriere had been pulled for an extra attacker.

Departures

Recruiting

Roster
As of September 28, 2021.

|}

Standings

Schedule and results

|-
!colspan=12 style=";" | Exhibition

|-
!colspan=12 style=";" | Regular Season

|-
!colspan=12 style=";" |

Scoring statistics

Goaltending statistics

Rankings

Note: USCHO did not release a poll in week 24.

Players drafted into the NHL

2022 NHL Entry Draft

† incoming freshman

References

2021-22
Vermont Catamounts
Vermont Catamounts
Vermont Catamounts
Vermont Catamounts